Giacomo Mari (17 October 1924 – 16 October 1991) was an Italian footballer who played as a midfielder.

Club career
After three years of breaking in at Atalanta in his early career, Mari played four seasons with Juventus, winning two Serie A championships, playing alongside the great Carlo Parola. Before the 1954 World Cup, he went to Sampdoria and then concluded playing in Serie A with Padova.

International career
Giacomo Mari is one of five Italian players (the others are Giampiero Boniperti, Gino Cappello, Ermes Muccinelli and Egisto Pandolfini) that played for Italy in both the 1950 and 1954 World Cups.  With the Italian national team, he debuted at the 1948 London Olympics, against Paraguay; he also featured against Switzerland at the 1954 World Cup.

Style of play
A tireless runner, Giacomo Mari was a classic halfback, waiting in the folds of midfield ready to halt the attack of the opposing forwards and wings.

References

External links
 La Gazzetta dello Sport

1924 births
1991 deaths
Italian footballers
Association football midfielders
U.S. Cremonese players
U.C. Sampdoria players
Juventus F.C. players
Atalanta B.C. players
Calcio Padova players
Serie A players
Olympic footballers of Italy
Footballers at the 1948 Summer Olympics
Italy international footballers
1950 FIFA World Cup players
1954 FIFA World Cup players
Italian football managers
Calcio Padova managers